Bill Bonnar is a founding member of the Scottish Socialist Party.

Personal life 
A socialist activist for over forty years in Scotland, London, and Sudan, Bonnar has wide-ranging experience in the trade union movement and community politics. He worked as an aid worker in Sudan before the 1989 coup, and has worked full-time in the field of Community Development and Social and Economic Regeneration for the past 25 years.

He worked for two years as a Community Worker in South Lanarkshire, seven years as Development Officer with housing associations in Glasgow and South Lanarkshire, including Govan Housing Association, and five years as a Social Enterprise Advisor with Glasgow Regeneration Agency.

Bonnar has a degree in Politics and History from the University of Stirling. He is married to Vivienne and they have two daughters, Katie and Jenny.

Political career 
Bonnar became involved in politics as a teenager, joining the UK's Young Communist League in 1974 and the Communist Party of Great Britain (CPGB) in 1975. He was elected to the National Executive Committee of the Young Communist League and as Secretary of the Young Communist League in Scotland. At Stirling University, he was Secretary of the Communist Society.

At some point, Bonnar served on the editorial committee of Marxism Today, a theoretical magazine generally seen as the standard-bearer for the "reformist" wing of the CPGB. Bonnar remained a Communist Party member until the party's dissolution in 1991.

While in London, Bonnar worked for left-wing bookshop Central Books, and was chairperson of the Connolly Association's London South branch. He has held various trade union positions in Glasgow and London. During his time as an aid worker in Sudan, he was an active member of the then-legal Sudanese Communist Party in Darfur and Khartoum.

After the dissolution of the CPGB, Bonnar helped found the Communist Party of Scotland and became its National Secretary. In 1996, he was a founding member of the Scottish Socialist Alliance (SSA) and stood as its candidate in Glasgow Anniesland in the 1997 general election. He became a founding member of the Scottish Socialist Party in 1998, and stood as the candidate for Glasgow Rutherglen in the 2003 Scottish Parliament election, where he won 2,259 votes (9.6%).
He contested the newly-drawn Rutherglen and Hamilton West seat at the 2005 United Kingdom general election for the SSP, but failed to be elected. Bonnar finished in fifth place with 1,164 votes and a vote share of 2.7%.

Among other community work, Bonnar spearheaded a successful effort to commemorate ten volunteers from Rutherglen and Cambuslang who fought in the Spanish Civil War as part of the International Brigades with a plaque in Rutherglen Town Hall.

Bonnar was re-elected as the Scottish Socialist Party's co-chair alongside Frances Curran at its 2014 conference. At the party's 2015 conference seven months later, he stood down as co-chair and was returned unopposed as National Secretary, taking over from Kevin McVey.

He was the SSP's candidate in the Govan ward in Glasgow at the 2017 and 2022 Scottish local elections.

References 

Living people
Scottish Socialist Party politicians
Year of birth missing (living people)
Place of birth missing (living people)
Politicians from Glasgow